Milvale is a small village in southern New South Wales, Australia. The locality is in the Hilltops Council local government area.

At the 2016 census the population of Milvale was 67, which had increased to 89 at the 2021 census.

Transport 

References 

Populated places in New South Wales
Hilltops Council